Lecithocera paulianella is a moth in the family Lecithoceridae. It was described by Viette in 1955. It is found on Madagascar.

References

Moths described in 1955
paulianella
Moths of Madagascar